Putún was the name of a Mayan chiefdom of the Yucatán Peninsula, before the arrival of the Spanish conquistadors in the sixteenth century. Its capital was Itzamkanac.

References

Mayan chiefdoms of the Yucatán Peninsula